Backusella parvicylindrica is a species of zygote fungus in the order Mucorales. It was described by Andrew S. Urquhart and James K. Douch in 2020. The specific epithet is from Latin parvus (small) and Greek kylindros (cylinder), referring to the sporangiospore dimensions. The type locality is Jack Cann Reserve, Australia.

See also
 
 Fungi of Australia

References

External links
 

Mucoraceae
Fungi described in 2020